The Tour de Nesle was one of the four large guard towers on the old city wall of Paris, constructed at the beginning of the 13th century by Philip II of France and demolished in 1665.

The tower was situated on the left (south) bank of the Seine facing the old castle of the Louvre on the opposite bank. Originally known as the Tour Hamelin, it was a cylindrical structure of approximately 10 metres in diameter. The height was around 25 metres, with a stair turret reaching higher still. Later, the tower was incorporated into the Hôtel de Nesle, a medieval mansion.

On the right bank of the Seine river was a similar tall tower: the Tour du Coin (corner tower). The towers protected the upstream approach to the Île de la Cité.

In 1308, Philip IV bought the tower from Amaury de Nesle. 

In 1314, a scandal known as the Tour de Nesle affair implicated the daughters-in-law of Philip IV, who were accused of adultery. Many of the alleged liaisons were said to have occurred in the Tour de Nesle. The scandal led to torture and execution for the princesses' lovers and the imprisonment of the princesses, with lasting consequences for the final years of the House of Capet.

In 1319, Philip V donated the building to his Queen Jeanne de Bourgogne (the one accused who was found innocent) and she, in her will, left it for the College of Burgundy, which she founded for the University of Paris. Demolished in 1665, mansion and tower became the place of the Collège des Quatre-Nations (later occupied by the Institut de France) with the Bibliothèque Mazarine.

In popular culture

In the 19th century, Alexandre Dumas wrote the celebrated romance La Tour de Nesle (1832), in which he portrayed the place as a theatre of orgy and the place of murder of a Queen of France at the beginning of the 14th century, (likely  Margaret of Burgundy). His story is based on the fifteenth-century legend based on events alleged to have taken place in 1314.

The story was also the basis of a 1955 film known in English as Tower of Lust (French: La Tour de Nesle).

Le Roi de fer (1955), the first novel of Maurice Druon's seven-volume series Les Rois maudits (The Accursed Kings), describes the affair and the subsequent executions in lurid and imaginative detail.

References 

Imago Mundi - Tour de Nesle.

Gallery

External links 

 Scandale de la Tour de Nesle

Towers completed in the 13th century
History of Paris
Fortifications of Paris
Former buildings and structures in Paris
Fortified towers
Buildings and structures demolished in the 17th century
Towers in Paris